The 1935 Victorian Football Association season was the 57th season of the Australian rules football competition. The premiership was won by the Yarraville Football Club, after it defeated Camberwell by nine points in the Grand Final on 7 September. It was the club's first VFA premiership, won in its eighth season of competition.

Finals venue 
After having played finals at the central Olympic Park for the previous two seasons, the Association returned to the practice of playing finals at suburban Association grounds. Toorak Park, which had never previously hosted a final, was used for both a semi-final and the Grand Final.

Premiership 
The home-and-home season was played over eighteen matches, before the top four clubs contested a finals series under the Page–McIntyre system to determine the premiers for the season.

Ladder

Finals

Awards 
 Bill Luff (Camberwell) was the leading goalkicker for the season; he kicked 64 goals in the home-and-home season and 75 goals overall.
 In the two parallel Association best-and-fairest awards:
 Les White (Prahran) won the Recorder Cup, polling six votes from only thirteen games, having missed five games due to injury. Allan Hopkins (Yarraville), L. Wedgwood (Yarraville), Len Pye (Northcote) and M. McFarlane (Coburg) finished equal-second with four votes apiece.
 Jim Dowling (Brunswick) and F. Brooks (Williamstown) were joint winners of the Association Medal, each polling 32 votes; it was Dowling's second consecutive Association Medal. Len Pye (Northcote) was third with 31 votes.
 Coburg won the seconds premiership. Coburg 6.11 (47) defeated Port Melbourne 3.9 (27) in the Grand Final on Saturday 7 September at the Brunswick Cricket Ground.

Notable events 
 Northcote, which lost both of its finals, was the first minor premier to fail to win the major premiership since  in 1922.
 A Grand Final rematch was played as a night exhibition match at Olympic Park on Thursday 26 September (Show Day holiday). Yarraville 8.18 (66) defeated Camberwell 5.17 (47). The attendance of 3,000 was considered a disappointment. The floodlights were considered too dim to be entirely effective for the players or spectators.

External links 
 List of VFA/VFL Premiers

References 

Victorian Football League seasons
VFL